Roberto Daniel Urquía (born December 24, 1948) is a former Argentine Senator for Córdoba Province and a member of the   Justicialist Party. Urquía, an accountant by profession, is a wealthy businessman and owner of the vegetable oil processing plant Aceitera General Deheza (AGD).

Urquía was born in General Deheza in Córdoba Province. He studied at the National University of Córdoba and qualified in accountancy and business administration. He became a teacher and a businessman. He became chairman of Aceitera General Deheza (AGD), a vegetable oil and biofuel plant.

In 1983 Urquía was elected a councillor on the General Deheza municipality. In 1987 he became mayor of his hometown and was re-elected in 1991 and 1995. In 1999 he was elected to the provincial Senate for Juárez Celman Department. He chaired the economy and finance committee. In 2001 he was elected to the legislature of the province.

Urquía was elected to the Argentine Senate in 2003.
He was part of the Front for Victory parliamentary group, supporting the national government of President Néstor Kirchner. He is noted as a wealthy senator, for instance having the most cars of any senator as of 2004.  He had been seen as a leading contender for the election to be the governor of Córdoba in 2007 but pulled out of the race in 2005. . His term expired on December 10, 2009.

External links
Senate profile

1948 births
Living people
People from Córdoba Province, Argentina
Justicialist Party politicians
Members of the Argentine Senate for Córdoba
Mayors of places in Argentina